The SamyGO project is publishing an aftermarket firmware of smart TVs by Samsung. It consists of a forum which contains various methods for rooting the smart TVs.

Features 
The project has implemented NFS and Samba file sharing, playback from USB devices and unlocked the use of Wi-Fi dongles not authorized by Samsung.

References

External links 
 

Samsung
Smart TV
Hacking (computer security)